Kathryn Ross (born 1966 in Africa) is a British writer of over 30 romance novels. Her  books have been translated into English, Spanish, French, Dutch, Portuguese, Italian  Modern Greek, Japanese, Swedish, Finnish, Afrikaans, Polish, Arabic, Danish, German, Hebrew, Korean, Turkish, Norwegian, and  Thai.

Ross lives in Lancashire, England. She is married and has two stepsons.

Bibliography

Single novels
Designed with Love (1989)
No Regrets (1990)
Playing by the Rules (1991)
By Love Alone (1992)
Total Possession (1993)
Divided by Love (1994)
Scent of Betrayal (1994)
Whisper of Scandal (1994)
Ruthless Contract (1995)
Seduced by the Enemy (1996)
The Boss's Mistress (1998)
A Marriage on Paper (1999)
Terms of Engagement (1999)
The Unmarried Father (2000)
Bride by Deception (2000)
The Eleventh Hour Groom (2001)
The Night of the Wedding (2001)
The Millionaire's Agenda (2002)
Her Determined Husband (2002)
The Secret Child (2002)
Blackmailed by the Boss (2003)
The Italian Marriage (2003)
A Spanish Engagement (2003)
A Latin Passion (2004)
The Frenchman's Mistress (2004)
The Millionaire's Secret Mistress (2005)
Mistress to a Rich Man (2005)
Taken by the Tycoon (2006)
Mediterranean Boss, Convenient Mistress (2007)
The Greek Tycoon's Innocent Mistress (2007)

Expecting! series multi-author
The Unexpected Father (1996)

Nanny Wanted series multi-author
The Love-Child (1997)

Big Event series multi-author
Bride for a Year (1998)

Omnibus in collaboration
Blackmailed Brides (2006) (with Kim Lawrence and Carole Mortimer)
Latin Affairs (2006) (with Helen Bianchin and Sharon Kendrick)
Convenient Weddings (2006) (with Jacqueline Baird and Helen Bianchin)

References and sources

External links
Kathryn Ross in Harlequin Editorial
Katryn Ross in Fantastic Fiction

English romantic fiction writers
Living people
1966 births